Steinahøfjellet is a mountain in Lom Municipality in Innlandet county, Norway. The mountain is surrounded by several other notable mountains including Storhøi to the east, Sandgrovhøi and Hesthøi to the northeast, Hestbrepiggene to the northwest, Steindalshøi and Svartdalshøi to the west, and Merrahøi to the southwest.

See also
List of mountains of Norway

References

Lom, Norway
Mountains of Innlandet